The men's 200 metres event at the 2005 Summer Universiade was held on 17–18 August in Izmir, Turkey.

Medalists

Results

Heats
Wind:Heat 1: -0.1 m/s,  Heat 2: +0.1 m/s,  Heat 3: +1.9 m/s,  Heat 4: 0.0 m/s,  Heat 5: +1.2 m/sHeat 6: +1.4 m/s,  Heat 7: +0.4 m/s,  Heat 8: -0.4 m/s,  Heat 9: +1.8 m/s

Quarterfinals
Wind:Heat 1: -0.1 m/s,  Heat 2: +0.3 m/s,  Heat 3: +0.3 m/s,  Heat 4: -0.4 m/s

Semifinals
Wind:Heat 1: -0.7 m/s,  Heat 2: +0.2 m/s

Final
Wind: +1.1 m/s

References
Finals results
Full results

Athletics at the 2005 Summer Universiade
2005